Spondylophryne villanyensis is a name given to a prehistoric amphibian placed in the family Discoglossidae (=Alytidae). It was described based on material from Villány, Hungary. Later studies have criticized the extreme brevity of the description and lack of illustration; the name could be considered a nomen nudum.

Description
The species description appears to comprise one sentence:"Spondylophryne villanyensis n. g. , n. sp.– Altertümlicher Typus von Baranophrys-Grösse, mit im Neuralbogen isoliertem erstem Wirbel im Urostyl".

See also

 Prehistoric amphibian
 List of prehistoric amphibians

References

Prehistoric frogs
Fossil taxa described in 1956